The Nanjing Yangtze River Bridge, previously called the First Nanjing Yangtze Bridge, is a double-decked road-rail truss bridge across the Yangtze River in Nanjing, Jiangsu, connecting the city's Pukou and Gulou districts. Its upper deck is  part of China National Highway 104, spanning . The bridge carries approximately 80,000 vehicles and 190 trains per day.

The bridge was completed and open for traffic in 1968. It was the third bridge over the Yangtze after the Wuhan Yangtze River Bridge and the Chongqing Baishatuo Yangtze River Bridge. It was the first heavy bridge designed and built using Chinese expertise.

Suicide site

According to state media, the Nanjing Yangtze River Bridge surpassed the Golden Gate Bridge as the most frequent suicide site in the world, with more than 2,000 suicides estimated by 2006.

Gallery

See also 
 
 Dashengguan Yangtze River Bridge Nanjing's other railway bridge that carries the Beijing–Shanghai High-Speed Railway.
 Yangtze River bridges and tunnels
 List of bridges in China
 Beijing–Shanghai Railway
 Rail transport in China
 Passenger rail transport in China

References
Notes

Bibliography

External links
 纪录片《南京长江大桥》 Nanjing Yangtze River Bridge Documentary (Chinese language) (1969)
 How to get to the Yangtze River Bridge
 Yangtze River Bridge: The Historic Landmark of Modern Nanjing

Buildings and structures in Nanjing
Bridges in Jiangsu
Double-decker bridges
Road-rail bridges in China
Bridges completed in 1968
Bridges over the Yangtze River
Transport in Nanjing
Truss bridges in China
1968 establishments in China
Suicide in China